The San Jose Formation is an Early Eocene (Wasatchian in the NALMA classification) geologic formation in the San Juan Basin of New Mexico and Colorado.

Description 

The San Jose Formation is mostly sandstone but with some mudstone beds. The formation was deposited by high-energy streams on a muddy floodplain that was the last preserved sedimentation episode in the San Juan Basin. Stream direction was from the northwest, north, and east towards the south.

The basal Cuba Mesa Member is found throughout the depositional basin and is a coarse-grained sheet sandstone. The Regina Member is floodplain mudstone and disconnected sheet sandstone that intertongues with the sandstone-dominated Ditch Canyon Member in the northwestern part of the basin and the Llaves Member on the east side of the basin. The uppermost member is the siltstone-dominated Tapicitos Member. The Cuba Mesa Member was deposited during subsidence in the basin center, while the later members were deposited during episodes of monoclinal folding along the Nacimiento Fault on the west escarpment of the Nacimiento Mountains.

Paleontology 
The mudstone beds of the San Jose Formation are locally rich in fossils. These include the  Almagre and Largo faunas of the early Eocene.

Fossil content 
Among others, the following fossils have been reported from the formation:

Mammals 
Primates

 Copelemur tutus
 Cantius angulatus
 C. frugivorus
 Microsyops angustidens
 M. latidens
 Omomyidae indet.

Artiodactyls

 Bunophorus grangeri
 Diacodexis cf. metsiacus
 Simpsonodus chacensis

Carnivora
 Vulpavus australis
Cimolesta
 Esthonyx bisulcatus
Ferae

 Ambloctonus sinosus
 Oxyaena lupina
 O. simpsoni

Glires

 Knightomys depressus
 K. reginensis
 Paramys copei
 P. nini

Hyaenodonta
 Hyaenodontidae indet.
Insectivora
 Apatemys bellulus
Pantodonta
 Coryphodon armatus
Perissodactyla

 Eohippus angustidens
 Systemodon tapirinus
 Xenicohippus osborni

Placentalia

 Copecion brachypternus
 Hyopsodus lysitensis
 Hyopsodus cf. mentalis
 Hyopsodus minor
 Meniscotherium chamense
 M. tapiacitum
 Hyopsodus sp.

Taeniodonta
 Ectoganus gliriformis
Theriiformes
 Creodonta indet.

Reptiles 
Snakes

 Cheilophis huerfanoensis
 Saniwa ensidens
 Sanjuanophis froehlichi
 cf. Calamagras primus
 cf. Saniwa sp.

Turtles

 Baena arenosa
 Baptemys garmanii
 Echmatemys lativertebralis
 Hadrianus majusculus
 Planetochelys dithyros
 Trionyx leptomitus
 Baltemys sp.
 Chelydridae indet.
 Trionychidae indet.

Lizards
 Paraglyptosaurus cf. yatkolai
 Lacertilia indet.

History of investigation 
In late 1874, Edward Drinker Cope was a member of the Wheeler Survey but ignored orders from Wheeler to proceed north from the Chama River to Colorado. Instead, he headed south to explore the area north of the San Pedro Mountains, where fossils had been reported. He found early Eocene fossils in the badlands north of Regina, New Mexico and spent about seven weeks collecting fishes, reptiles, and what was then the oldest known mammal fossils in North America. He also collected the fossil of a giant flightless bird. Cope later wrote his father that this was "the most important find in geology I have ever made".

In 1948, G.G. Simpson visited the same area and assigned the fossil beds to the San Jose Formation. In 1967, the formation was divided (in ascending order) into the Cuba Mesa Member, Regina Member, Llaves Member, and Tapicitos Member.

See also 

 List of fossiliferous stratigraphic units in Colorado
 List of fossiliferous stratigraphic units in New Mexico
 Paleontology in Colorado
 Paleontology in New Mexico

References

Bibliography 

 
 
 
 
 
 
 
 
 
 
 
 
 
 
 
 
 
 
 
 
 
 
 
 
 

Geologic formations of Colorado
Paleogene formations of New Mexico
Eocene Series of North America
Paleogene Colorado
Ypresian Stage
Wasatchian
Sandstone formations of the United States
Fluvial deposits
Paleontology in New Mexico